Henry Vassall (22 October 1860 – 5 January 1926) was an English rugby union player, writer, and master of Repton School, Derbyshire. He was best known as a centre for Oxford University. Vassall played international rugby for England in the early years of the sport, winning five caps and scoring a hat-trick of tries in the first encounter between England and Wales.

While at Oxford University Vassall led the university rugby side to 70 matches without defeat during his three-year captaincy. His belief that the forward players should work in unison with their backs was revolutionary to the game of rugby and changed the way that rugby was played at club and country level. He is recognised as one of the most important figures in the early development of the sport.

Early life
Vassall was born in Barwick in Elmet, a township in the Tadcaster district of Yorkshire, in 1860, the son of William Vassall and his wife Martha Ann. His father was a rector originally from Great Wigston in Leicestershire, his mother a native of Leeds, who was fifteen years her husband's junior. Just after Harry (named Henry) was born, his family, including his two older siblings William and Margaret, moved to Hardington Mandeville in Somerset where his father took up the post of rector of the parish. Henry's mother had been just nineteen when his eldest brother William was born in 1858, and Margaret and Henry had followed in successive years. 

After moving to Hardington, Henry's family continued to grow at a prodigious rate and between 1861 and 1882 Henry gained a further twelve siblings, the last of which was Leonard born in 1882 when Martha was forty-two. This was the year before Henry's father's death in 1883. Henry was educated at Marlborough College before matriculating to Hertford College, Oxford in 1879.

Rugby career

Vassall had played rugby during his college days at Marlborough, a school only second to Rugby in its impact on the emergence of rugby football. He continued playing at Oxford, and he was part of the Oxford University team in the 1879 Varsity Match, gaining his first sporting 'Blue'. Vassall played in the 1880 Varsity Match and the same season was made the team's honorary secretary. As secretary he brought to the University team a level of organisation that had previously not existed. He ensured the college games were properly organised and set up trials to ensure the best players were chosen.

In the 1881 season a match was arranged between England and Wales, the very first international match for the Welsh. A space was left in the England team in the pack for an Oxford University player, which was given to Vassall. Wales were completely unprepared, and the team was constructed to appease regional sides, the result was an 8–0 defeat (82–0 by modern standards). Vassall had an excellent game, scoring a hat-trick of tries, the first individual to ever achieve this feat in an international rugby game. His reign as the highest try scorer in a single international game was short lived, as during the same encounter George Burton surpassed him minutes later by scoring four.

Repton School
By 1925, Vassall was master of Repton School, Derbyshire.

Notes

Bibliography

External links

 

1860 births
1926 deaths
English rugby union players
Rugby union centres
Blackheath F.C. players
Oxford University RFC players
England international rugby union players
People educated at Marlborough College
People from Tadcaster
Alumni of Hertford College, Oxford
World Rugby Hall of Fame inductees
Rugby union players from Yorkshire